Funke is a surname of German origin.

Funke may also refer to:

Funke Digital TV, Dutch antenna manufacturer
Funke Mediengruppe, a German newspaper and media publisher group
5712 Funke, an asteroid

See also
 Funcke
 Funk (disambiguation)